Kenneth Carlsen was the defending champion but lost in the third round to Hyung-Taik Lee.

Rainer Schüttler won in the final 7–6(7–5), 6–2 against Sébastien Grosjean.

Seeds
All sixteen seeds received a bye to the second round.

Draw

Finals

Top half

Section 1

Section 2

Bottom half

Section 3

Section 4

References
 2003 AIG Japan Open Tennis Championships Draw

Singles